Czechoslovakia competed at the 1980 Summer Paralympics in Arnhem, Netherlands. 7 competitors from Czechoslovakia won 2 medals, 1 silver and 1 bronze, and finished 37th in the medal table.

See also 
 Czechoslovakia at the Paralympics
 Czechoslovakia at the 1980 Summer Olympics

References 

Czechoslovakia at the Paralympics
1980 in Czechoslovak sport
Nations at the 1980 Summer Paralympics